Michael J. Therien is the William R. Kenan, Jr. Professor of Chemistry at Duke University.

Career
Therien received his B.S. in Chemistry from University of St. Andrews in 1982. He began his studies in organometallic chemistry at University of California, San Diego, where he earned his Ph.D. in 1987 working with William C. Trogler. Upon completion of his Ph.D. in 1987, he was a National Institutes of Health Postdoctoral Fellow at the California Institute of Technology under Harry B. Gray.  In 1990, he was appointed Assistant Professor of Chemistry at University of Pennsylvania, where he was promoted to Associate Professor in 1996, full Professor in 1997, and named Alan G. MacDiarmid Professor in 2002.  In 2008 he was appointed William R. Kenan, Jr. Professor of Chemistry at Duke University, the position he currently holds.

Current research
The Therien laboratory designs and characterizes supermolecular structures, bioinspired assemblies, and nanoscale materials that possess exceptional optical, electronic, and excited-state dynamical properties. His laboratory pioneered new approaches to engineer electro-optic function important for light harvesting, long-wavelength emission, imaging, frequency doubling, and photon upconversion. Other accomplishments include: defining molecular wires that enable expansive charge delocalization; developing carbon nanotube superstructures that facilitate energy conversion; and illuminating biologically important mechanistic insights critical for generating high-energy photoproducts.

Major publications
(Publications listed below have been cited more than 200 times)

Awards and honors
Fellow, John Simon Guggenheim Memorial Foundation, 2020
Fellow, Royal Flemish Academy of Belgium for Science and the Arts, 2009
International Francqui Chair, 2008
Fellow, American Association for the Advancement of Science, 2005
Philadelphia Section Award, American Chemical Society, 2004
Young Investigator Award, Society of Porphyrins & Phthalocyanines, 2002
Fellow, Alfred P. Sloan Foundation, 1995
NSF National Young Investigator, 1993-98
Young Investigator Award, Arnold and Mabel Beckman Foundation, 1992-1994
Searle Scholar, 1991>

References

Living people
21st-century American chemists
University of California, San Diego alumni
Duke University faculty
Year of birth missing (living people)